"Dreams Die Hard" is a song written by Chick Rains, and recorded by American country music artist Gary Morris.  It was released in July 1982 as the third single from the album Gary Morris.  The song reached #15 on the Billboard Hot Country Singles & Tracks chart.

Chart performance

References

1982 singles
Gary Morris songs
Song recordings produced by Paul Worley
Warner Records singles
Songs written by Chick Rains
1982 songs